Brandon Beresford (born July 15, 1992) is a professional footballer who plays as a midfielder.

Born in the United States, he represents Guyana at international level.

Club career
Beresford has played college soccer for the Graceland Yellowjackets, and at senior level for Des Moines Menace, Forest City London, Michigan Bucks, FC Tucson, Slingerz FC, Rochester Rhinos, and Peachtree City MOBA.

International career
Despite being born in the United States, Beresford was eligible to represent Guyana at international level, and made his senior debut for them on 17 November 2010.

International goals
Scores and results list Guyana's goal tally first.

References

1992 births
Living people
American sportspeople of Guyanese descent
Citizens of Guyana through descent
American soccer players
Guyanese footballers
Guyanese expatriate footballers
Guyana international footballers
Des Moines Menace players
FC London players
Flint City Bucks players
FC Tucson players
Slingerz FC players
Rochester New York FC players
Soccer players from California
Expatriate soccer players in Canada
Guyanese expatriate sportspeople in Canada
USL League Two players
Graceland University alumni
Sportspeople from San Bernardino County, California
People from Loma Linda, California
USL Championship players
Association football midfielders
2019 CONCACAF Gold Cup players
Expatriate footballers in Portugal